William Percy (7 April 1428 at Alnwick Castle – 26 April 1462) was a late medieval Bishop of Carlisle. He was the fifth son of Henry Percy, 2nd Earl of Northumberland, and his wife Lady Eleanor Neville. Percy was in 1451 appointed to be Chancellor of the University of Cambridge, a post he held until 1456. He was selected 30 August 1452 to be Bishop of Carlisle following the appointment of his predecessor Nicholas Close to the Bishopric of Coventry and Lichfield. Percy was consecrated between 16 November and 18 December 1452. He died on 26 April 1462.

Citations

References

 

Chancellors of the University of Cambridge
Bishops of Carlisle
William
Younger sons of earls
1428 births
1462 deaths
15th-century English Roman Catholic bishops